The Vulcan salute ("🖖") is a hand gesture popularized by the 1960s television series Star Trek. It consists of a raised hand with the palm forward and the thumb extended, while the fingers are parted between the middle and ring finger.

Background
The Vulcan "salute" was devised by Leonard Nimoy, who portrayed the half Vulcan character Mr. Spock on the original Star Trek television series. A 1968 New York Times interview described the gesture as a "double-fingered version of Churchill's victory sign". Nimoy said in that interview that he "decided that the Vulcans were a "hand-oriented" people".

The greeting first appeared in 1967 on the Star Trek second-season opening episode, "Amok Time". Among other things, the gesture is known for being difficult for certain people to do properly without practice or the covert pre-positioning of the fingers. Actors on the original show reportedly had to position their fingers off-screen with the other hand before raising their hand into frame. This difficulty may stem from variations in individuals' manual dexterity. It is parodied in the 1996 motion picture Star Trek: First Contact when Zefram Cochrane, upon meeting a Vulcan for the first time in human history, is unable to return the gesture and instead shakes the Vulcan's hand.

In his 1975 autobiography I Am Not Spock, Nimoy, who was Jewish, wrote that he based it on the Priestly Blessing performed by Jewish Kohanim with both hands, thumb to thumb in this same position, representing the Hebrew letter Shin (ש in Square Script, or Paleo Hebrew 𐤔‎), which has three upward strokes similar to the position of the thumb and fingers in the gesture. The letter Shin here stands for El Shaddai, meaning "Almighty (God)", as well as for Shekhinah and Shalom. Nimoy wrote that when he was a child, his grandfather took him to an Orthodox synagogue, where he saw the blessing performed and was impressed by it.

(The emoji's Common Locale Data Repository annotation has American English short name "vulcan salute" and keywords "finger", "hand", "spock" and "vulcan" [all lowercase].)

U.S. President Barack Obama referenced the Vulcan salutation in his statement on Nimoy's death, calling it "the universal sign for 'Live long and prosper'". The following day, NASA astronaut Terry W. Virts posted a photo on his Twitter feed from the International Space Station showing the salutation (with the Earth in the background) as the ISS passed over where Nimoy grew up - Boston, Massachusetts, United States.

"Live long and prosper"

The accompanying spoken blessing, "live long and prosper" – "dif-tor heh smusma" in the Vulcan language (as spoken in the 1979 film Star Trek: The Motion Picture) – also appeared for the first time in "Amok Time", scripted by Theodore Sturgeon. The less-well-known reply is "peace and long life", though it is sometimes said first, with "live long and prosper" as the reply. The phrase has been seen abbreviated "LLAP".

An ancient Egyptian blessing "ankh wedja seneb", while its verbatim translation is uncertain, uses the three symbols "life", "prosperity" and "health"; it has been translated as "may he live, be prosperous, be healthy".

The New International Version of the Bible, Deuteronomy 5:33 (5:30 in the Masoretic Text), includes the phrase "live and prosper" as part of Moses' admonitions to the Hebrew people prior to entering Canaan; other translations include the notion of long life as well.

William Shakespeare's 1594 Romeo and Juliet contains the line, "Live and be prosperous: and farewell good fellow", spoken by Romeo to Balthasar, his friend and servant.

The benediction "live and prosper" is attributed to the 18th-century organized crime figure Jonathan Wild in his 1725 biography written by "H.D.", possibly a pseudonym for Daniel Defoe.

In Trilby by George du Maurier, published in 1894, a description of an art student ends with the sentence, "May he live long and prosper!"

The phrase is attributed to Stephen Crane by Willa Cather in her essay "When I Knew Stephen Crane," first published in 1900: "You have to have the itch of the thing in your fingers, and if you haven't,—well, you're damned lucky, and you'll live long and prosper, that's all."

Photo gallery

See also

 Vulcan changeup, baseball pitch
 Open Hand Monument, conceived in 1948 by Le Corbusier

References

External links

 
  A page by Rabbi Yonassan Gershom, with photos and diagrams of how the Salute forms the Hebrew letter Shin, the use of the Blessing Hands gesture on Jewish gravestones and jewelry, etc.
 

Priestly Blessing
Salute
Greetings
Hand gestures
Salutes
Leonard Nimoy
Fictional symbols